Piran Kaliyar is the dargah of 13th-century Sufi saint of Chishti Order, Alauddin Ali Ahmed Sabir Kalyari also known as Sarkar Sabir Pak and Sabir Kaliyari, situated at Kaliyar village, near Haridwar on the banks of Ganga Canal, 7 km. from Roorkee.
It is one of the most revered shrines for Muslims in India and is equally revered by Hindus and Muslims. The dargah shrine  was built by Ibrahim Lodhi, an Afghan ruler of Delhi.

He was the Sufi Saint of Chishti Order in the 13th century, a successor to Baba Farid (1188–1280), and the first in the Sabiriya branch of Chishti Order.

Allauddin Ali Ahmad Sabir Kaliyari
Alauddin Sabir Kaliyari was born in Kohtwaal, a town in the district of Multan in 19 Rabi al-awwal, 592 Hijri (1196). He was the son of Jamila Khatun, who was the elder sister of Baba Fareed. After the death of his father, Syed Abul Rahim, his mother brought him to Pakpattan in 1204 to Baba Fareed. Baba Fareed's sister gave custody of Alauddin to him and asked him to take care of the boy, who later made him his disciple. Baba Fareed made him in charge of the langar. After a very long time Alauddin's mother came to see him and found him very weak. She was angry at her brother and demanded an explanation. Baba Fareed explained that he was made in charge of the kitchen and hence had no shortage of food. When Alauddin was asked he replied, "True, I was made in charge of the kitchen, but I was never told I can eat from it". When asked how he managed to remain alive, he revealed he went to the jungle in free time and ate whatever he found. He was then given the title Sabir.

He reached Kaliyar Sharif in 1253 AD, after being anointed as the protector of Kaliyar Sharif by Baba Fareed, who asked him to go to Kaliyar, he stayed at Kaliyar for the rest of his life, and died here in 13th Rabi al-awwal 690 Hijri (1291).

Hazrat sabir was far recognized for his jalal. His studies were basically more spiritual and his main teacher was his peer, his uncle Baba Fareed.

Piran Kaliyar
Over the centuries, a small town developed around the shrine and came to be known as Piran Kaliyar. In later history, India's first steam engine, Mary Lind, (specially shipped from England moved on rails in India) ran in Roorkee on 22 December 1851, between Roorkee and Piran Kaliyar, two years before the first passenger train ran from Bombay to Thane in 1853. Operated by the Bengal Sappers, the railway line was built to carry soil used for the construction of the Upper Ganges Canal aqueduct from Piran Kaliyar, 10 km (6.2 miles) from the city.

Today, Piran Kaliyar Sharif is also an Uttarakhand Legislative Assembly constituency, part of the Haridwar Lok Sabha constituency.

References 

 Piran Kaliyar carthage.edu.

Dargahs in India
Haridwar district
Religion in Uttarakhand